The Northwest Intercollegiate Sailing Association (NWICSA) is one of seven conferences within the Intercollegiate Sailing Association (ICSA), the governing body for collegiate competition in the sport of sailing.

The NWICSA currently consists of teams from colleges and universities in Oregon, Washington and British Columbia, Canada.

Members

References

External links
ICSA - Intercollegiate Sailing Association - (official website) www.collegesailing.com

ICSA conferences